Chenango, which means "Bull thistle" in the Oneida language, may refer to:

 Chenango County, New York, a county in the United States of America
 Chenango, New York, a town in Broome County
 Chenango River, a river in New York
 Chenango Forks, New York, a community in Broome County
 Chenango Canal, a former canal in New York
 USS Chenango, the name of two naval ships
 Chenango, Texas, an unincorporated community in Brazoria County
 Chenango Avenue, an avenue in Denver, Colorado
 Chenango, a subdivision in Centennial, Colorado
 Chenango Pl., street in West Lafayette, IN